Santhagara is a Pali word derived from combination of Santha or Sanstha in Sanskrit (group) and Agara (house or assembly point) and was used for the general assembly hall of a particular  kshatriya clan of ancient northern India where the old and younger of the same clan meets to decide on the general and state affairs. Buddhist literatures show that Santhagara of republic states used to control foreign affairs, entertaining foreign Ambassadors and princes, and deciding on peace and war proposals. Other evidences of this period identifies s or s as not completely democracies but sort of corporations and also not as republics but oligarchies, where power was exercised by groups of people.

Origin of Santhagara

Buddhist and Jain literatures gives references about Santhagara  with  non-monarchial states like Shakyas of Kapilvastu, the Mallakas of Pava and Kusinara, the Licchavikas or Licchavi (kingdom) of Vaisali, the Vaidehas of Mithila, the  Koliyas of Ramagrama  and  Devadaha (Nawalparasi), the Moriyas of Pipphalvana, and the Bhaggas with their capital on Sumsumara Hill. Maha-Govinda Suttanta  gives references about Sakya's heaven which was modeled on Santhagara of Sakya. The Lichchhavi santhagara is mentioned in detail in The Ekpanna Jataka, Chullakalinga Jataka (Jataka tales)and Mahāvastu.

Functioning of Santhagara

The minimum age to become member of Shakya Santhagara was twenty years.

In the assembly, there were different posts known as Vargya, Grihya and Pakshya who clashed from time to time for power. The term Dvandva was used to denote the rival parties and the term Vyutkramana to their rivalry. Transaction of the Assembly business strictly required a Quorum without which it was considered invalid. The seat regulator whose main job was to allot the seats to persons on dais, front seats and other places depending on their position was known as “Asanapannapaka”. Voting was done with pieces of wood known as salaka. The collector of votes was the Salaka-Grahapaka, chosen for this job on account of his reputation of his honesty and impartiality. The word used for votes was “Chhanda” which meant free choice. The president of the state who was known as “Samghyamukhya” was responsible for presiding the assembly and regulating the debates. He was expected to observe strict impartiality and if he failed, he was furiously criticized. The voting methodology was of three types – by Guthaka (secret method), by Sakarnajapakam (whispering method) and by Vivatakam (Open method). Generally the assembly contains four to twenty executive members. The Raja (King), Upa-Raja (Sub-ordinate king), Senapati (military commanders) and Bhandagarika (treasurers) seem to be the designation of four executive members.

The Malla state, which was small, had an executive of four members only in their Santhagara, all of them have taken a prominent part in the funeral of Buddha. On the other hand, Lichchhavis had nine Executive officers (kings) in their assembly. The confederations of Lichchhavis and Videhas had Executive of Eighteen members. According to Buddhist literatures, the Lichchhavis formed a league with Videha and together they were called as “Vajjis”. Lichchhavis had once formed a federation with their neighbor, The Malla. The federal council was composed of eighteen members, nine Lichchhavis and nine Malla. In a federation, both parties were having equal rights even though Malla were not a great power as Lichchhavis.

Events associated with Santhagara

Siddhārtha Gautama, Gautama Buddha was initiated as member of Shakya Santhagara when he turned twenty. When he was twenty eight years old, a major clash took place between Koliya and Sakya over water of Rohini River. Shakya military commander decided to start a war on Koliya and Siddhartha opposed it. Siddhartha brought peace proposal in front of Santhagara which failed miserably during voting. As a consequence Siddhartha has to go in exile, Pabbajja
According to Ambattha sutta , of the Digha Nikaya, when the Brahmana Ambattha visited Kapilvastu, members of the Shakya assembly are said to have laughed at him, treating him with scant respect.
Shakyans who were proud of superiority of their blood, decided not give a Shakyan girl to Pasenadi, King of Kosala in their Santhagara and instead gave slave girl as Shakyan girl. This resulted in mass scale massacre of Shakyas and demolition of santhagara by Virudhaka, son of Prasenjit after knowing the truth.
Lichchhavis honored the beautiful courtesan Ambapali as Nagarvadhu in one of their annual meetings.
Malla and Lichchhavis as per Buddhist literatures, requested lord Gautama Buddha to perform the opening ceremonies of their Santhagar by first using them for delivering a sermon to a congregation assembled therein.
Gautama Buddha was very pleased to see the functioning of Lichchhavi Santhagara and he directed his pupils to pattern the Buddhist monastic order (Buddhist sangha) on the Lichchhavis sangha polities.
The Malla of Kusinara, Kushinagar discussed the problems related to funeral of Buddha and disposal of his ashes in their Santhagara.

Fall of Santhagara

Santhagara started to disappear with the fall of republican states like Malla, Shakya, and Lichchhavis. Malla lost their independence to Magadha Empire soon after Buddha’s death. Magadha King Ajatshatru conquered Lichchhavis after a prolonged battle which continued for 16 years. Later on Samudraguptas military campaign finished the Lichchhavis states.

Legacy of Santhagara at present

The main religion of republic states was Buddhism and in case of few, it was Jainism. With rise of monarch and Vedic Brahmanism, major fraction of republic kshatriyas like Malla, Lichchhavis migrated towards South India and Nepal respectively. On the other side, Mauryas were defamed as Shudra by Brahmin Shunga dynasty. The remaining republic Buddhist kshatriyas of this region who were moderate towards Brahmanism accepted Hinduism back. Faxian describes about suryavanshi kshatriyas of Ramgram, Koliyaclan ,  joining Santhavara Sangha of kshatriyas after fall of Buddhism due to their social and political orientation. Mahapandit Rahul Sankrityayan, Dr. Rajbali Pandey, Tripatkacharya Mahopadhyay Bkishu Buddhamitra, Kumar Suresh Singh, Dr. Raghunath Chand Kaushik who did extensive research on Buddhist places and society are of view that Sainthwar kshatriya carries the Buddhist legacy of Santhagara. Today's Sainthwar community consists of ancient Malla, Koliya, Shakya and Lichchhavis kshatriya along with rajputs of Mahabat Khan's 1626 rebellion against Jahangir.

References

Further reading
Faces of the feminine in ancient, medieval, and modern India – By Mandakranta Bose (Page 80-81)
Lord Mahavira and His times – By Kailash Chand Jain (page 233-249)
A History of Ancient and Early Medieval India: From the Stone age to 12th Century – By Upinder Singh (Pages 267-269)
Dialogues of the Buddha, volume 2- By Thomas William Rhys Davids (page 113)
Ancient India – By R. C. Majumdar (pages 157-158)

Vedic period